Walter Winchell (April 7, 1897 – February 20, 1972) was a syndicated American newspaper gossip columnist and radio news commentator. Originally a vaudeville performer, Winchell began his newspaper career as a Broadway reporter, critic and columnist for New York tabloids. He rose to national celebrity in the 1930s with Hearst newspaper chain syndication and a popular radio program. He was known for an innovative style of gossipy staccato news briefs, jokes and Jazz Age slang. Biographer Neal Gabler claimed that his popularity and influence "turned journalism into a form of entertainment".

He uncovered both hard news and embarrassing stories about famous people by exploiting his exceptionally wide circle of contacts, first in the entertainment world and the Prohibition era underworld, then in law enforcement and politics. He was known for trading gossip, sometimes in return for his silence. His outspoken style made him both feared and admired. Novels and movies were based on his wisecracking gossip columnist persona, as early as the play and film Blessed Event in 1932. As World War II approached in the 1930s, he attacked the appeasers of Nazism, then in the 1950s he aligned with Joseph McCarthy in his campaign against communists. He damaged the reputation of Josephine Baker as well as other individuals who had earned his enmity. However, the McCarthy connection in time made him unfashionable, and his style did not adapt well to television news.

He did return to television in 1959 as narrator of the 1930s-set crime drama series The Untouchables. Over the years he appeared in more than two dozen films and television productions as an actor, sometimes playing himself.

Professional career
Winchell was born in New York City, the son of Jennie (Bakst) and Jacob Winchell, a cantor and salesman; they were Russian Jewish immigrants. He left school in the sixth grade and started performing in Gus Edwards's vaudeville troupe known as the "Newsboys Sextet", which also featured Eddie Cantor and  George Jessel. During this time, Winchell performed as a tap dancer. Winchell served in the U.S. Navy during World War I, reaching the rank of lieutenant commander.

He began his career in journalism by posting notes about his acting troupe on backstage bulletin boards. He joined the Vaudeville News in 1920, then left the paper for the Evening Graphic in 1924, where his column was named Mainly About Mainstreeters. He was hired on June 10, 1929, by the New York Daily Mirror, where he became the author of the first syndicated gossip column, entitled On-Broadway. The column was syndicated by King Features Syndicate.

He made his radio debut over WABC in New York, a CBS affiliate, on May 12, 1930. The show, titled Saks on Broadway, was a 15-minute feature that provided business news about Broadway. He switched to WJZ (later renamed WABC) and the NBC Blue (later ABC Radio) in 1932 for the Jergens Journal.

Underworld connections

By the 1930s, Winchell was "an intimate friend of Owney Madden, New York's no. 1 gang leader of the prohibition era", but in 1932 Winchell's intimacy with criminals caused him to fear he would be murdered. He fled to California and "returned weeks later with a new enthusiasm for law, G-men, Uncle Sam, [and] Old Glory". His coverage of the Lindbergh kidnapping and subsequent trial received national attention. Within two years, he befriended J. Edgar Hoover, the no. 1 G-man of the repeal era. He was responsible for turning Louis "Lepke" Buchalter of Murder, Inc. over to Hoover.
His newspaper column was syndicated in over 2,000 newspapers worldwide, and he was read by 50 million people per day from the 1920s until the early 1960s. His Sunday night radio broadcast was heard by another 20 million people from 1930 to the late 1950s. In 1948, Winchell had the top-rated radio show when he surpassed Fred Allen and Jack Benny. One example of his profile at his professional peak was being mentioned in Richard Rodgers and Lorenz Hart's 1937 song "The Lady Is a Tramp": "I follow Winchell and read every line."

Outspoken views
Winchell was Jewish and was one of the first commentators in America to attack Adolf Hitler and American pro-fascist and pro-Nazi organizations such as the German-American Bund, especially its leader Fritz Julius Kuhn. He was a staunch supporter of President Franklin D. Roosevelt and the New Deal throughout the Depression era, and frequently served as the Roosevelt Administration's mouthpiece in favor of interventionism as the European war crisis loomed in the late 1930s.  Early on, he denounced American isolationists as favoring appeasement of Hitler, and was explicit in his attacks on such prominent isolationists as Charles Lindbergh, whom he dubbed "The Lone Ostrich", and Gerald L.K. Smith, whom he denounced as "Gerald Lucifer KKKodfish Smith". Throughout the 1930s and 1940s, Winchell was also an outspoken supporter of civil rights for African Americans, and frequently attacked the Ku Klux Klan and other racist groups as supporting un-American, pro-German goals.

During World War II, he attacked the National Maritime Union, the labor organization for the civilian United States Merchant Marine, which he said was run by Communists, instancing West Coast labor leader Harry Bridges. In 1948 and 1949, he and influential leftist columnist Drew Pearson attacked Secretary of Defense James Forrestal in columns and radio broadcasts.

Subsequently, Winchell began to denounce Communism as the main threat facing America.

Television
During the 1950s, Winchell supported Senator Joseph McCarthy's quest to identify Communists in the entertainment industry, but his popularity and influence began to decline as the public turned against McCarthy. His weekly radio broadcast was broadcast on ABC television on the same day as his radio broadcast. His program debuted on TV on October 5, 1952. Sponsored by Gruen Watch Company, it originated from WJZ-TV from 6:45 to 7 p.m. Eastern Time. By 1953, his radio and television broadcasts were simulcast until he ended that association because of a dispute with ABC executives in 1955. He starred in The Walter Winchell File, a television crime drama series that initially aired from 1957 to 1958, dramatizing cases from the New York City Police Department that were covered in the New York Daily Mirror. In 1956, he signed with NBC to host a variety program called The Walter Winchell Show, which was canceled after only 13 weeks—a particularly bitter failure in view of the success of his longtime rival Ed Sullivan in a similar format with The Ed Sullivan Show. ABC re-hired him in 1959 to narrate The Untouchables for four seasons. In 1960, a revival of the 1955 television simulcast of Winchell's radio broadcast was cancelled after six weeks.

In the early 1960s, a public dispute with Jack Paar effectively ended Winchell's career—already in decline due to a shift in power from print to television. Winchell had angered Paar several years earlier when he refused to retract an item alleging that Paar was having marital difficulties. Biographer Neal Gabler described the exchange on Paar's show in 1961:

Hostess Elsa Maxwell appeared on the program and began gibing at Walter, accusing him of hypocrisy for waving the flag while never having voted [which, incidentally, wasn't true; the show later issued a retraction]. Paar joined in. He said Walter's column was "written by a fly" and that his voice was so high because he wears "too-tight underwear" … [H]e also told the story of the mistaken item about his marriage, and cracked that Walter had a "hole in his soul".

On subsequent programs, Paar called Winchell a "silly old man" and cited other examples of his underhanded tactics. No one had previously dared to criticize Winchell publicly, but by then his influence had eroded to the point that he could not effectively respond. The New York Daily Mirror, his flagship newspaper for 34 years, closed in 1963; his readership dropped steadily, and he faded from the public eye.

Ethical failings
Winchell became known for his attempts to destroy the careers of his political and personal enemies as his own career progressed, especially after World War II. Favorite tactics were allegations of having ties to Communist organizations and accusations of sexual impropriety. He was not above name-calling; for example, he described New York radio host Barry Gray as "Borey Pink" and a "disk jerk". Winchell heard that Marlen Edwin Pew of the trade journal Editor & Publisher had criticized him as a bad influence on 
calling him "Marlen Pee-you".

For most of his career, his contracts with newspaper and radio employers required them to hold him harmless from any damages resulting from lawsuits for slander or libel. He unapologetically would publish material told to him in confidence by friends; when confronted over such betrayals, he typically responded, "I know—I'm just a son of a bitch." By the mid-1950s, he was widely seen as arrogant, cruel, and ruthless.

While on an American tour in 1951, Josephine Baker, who would never perform before segregated audiences, criticized the Stork Club's unwritten policy of discouraging black patrons, then scolded Winchell, an old ally, for not rising to her defense. Winchell responded swiftly with a series of harsh public rebukes, including accusations of Communist sympathies.  He spurned any attempts by friends to mitigate the heated rhetoric. The ensuing publicity resulted in the termination of Baker's work visa, forcing her to cancel all her engagements and return to France. It was almost a decade before U.S. officials allowed her back into the country. The adverse publicity of this, and similar incidents, undercut his credibility and power.

In his radio and television broadcasts on April 4, 1954, Winchell helped to stoke public fear of the polio vaccine. Winchell said, "Good evening, Mr. and Mrs. America ... and all the ships at sea. Attention everyone. In a few moments I will report on a new polio vaccine claimed to be a polio cure. It may be a killer." Winchell claimed that the U.S. Public Health Services found live polio viruses in seven of ten vaccine batches it tested, reporting, "It killed several monkeys ... the United States Public Health Service will confirm this in about 10 days." Dr. Jonas Salk, developer of the polio vaccine, immediately responded that the vaccine, which had been recently tested on 7,500 school children at the University of Pittsburgh, had been triple tested for the absence of live virus by its manufacturers, the National Institutes of Health, and in his own research lab, and that similar testing would continue to screen out future batches containing live virus.

Style
Many other columnists began to write gossip soon after Winchell's initial success, such as Ed Sullivan, who succeeded him at the New York Evening Graphic, and Louella Parsons in Los Angeles. He wrote in a style filled with slang and incomplete sentences. Winchell's casual writing style famously earned him the ire of mobster Dutch Schultz, who confronted him at New York's Cotton Club and publicly lambasted him for using the phrase "pushover" to describe Schultz's penchant for blonde women. Winchell's best known aphorisms  include: "Nothing recedes like success", and "I usually get my stuff from people who promised somebody else that they would keep it a secret".

Herman Klurfeld, a ghostwriter for Winchell for almost three decades, began writing  four newspaper columns per week for Winchell in 1936 and worked for him for 29 years. He also wrote many of the signature one-liners, called "lasties", that Mr. Winchell used at the end of his Sunday evening radio broadcasts. One of Klurfeld's quips was "She's been on more laps than a napkin". In 1952, the New York Post revealed Mr. Klurfeld as Mr. Winchell's ghostwriter. Klurfeld later wrote a biography of Winchell entitled Winchell, His Life and Times, which was the basis for the television film Winchell (1998).

Winchell opened his radio broadcasts by pressing randomly on a telegraph key, a sound that created a sense of urgency and importance, and using the catchphrase "Good evening, Mr. and Mrs. America from border to border and coast to coast and all the ships at sea. Let's go to press." He would then read each of his stories with a staccato delivery (up to a rate of 197 words per minute, though he claimed a speed of well over 200 words per minute in an interview in 1967), noticeably faster than the typical pace of American speech. His diction also can be heard in his breathless narration of the television series The Untouchables (1959–1963), as well as in several Hollywood films.

Personal life
On August 11, 1919, Winchell married Rita Greene, one of his onstage partners. The couple separated a few years later, and he moved in with Elizabeth June Magee, who had already adopted daughter Gloria and given birth to her and Winchell's first child Walda in 1927. Winchell eventually divorced Greene in 1928, but he never married Magee, although they lived as a married couple for the rest of their lives.

Winchell and Magee had three children: two daughters, Gloria (whom the couple adopted), Walda and a son, Walter Jr. Gloria died of pneumonia at the age of nine and Walda spent time in psychiatric hospitals. Walter Jr. died by suicide in the family garage on Christmas night of 1968. Having spent the previous two years on welfare, Walter Jr. had last been employed as a dishwasher in Santa Ana, California but listed himself as a freelancer who, for a time, wrote a column in the Los Angeles Free Press, an underground newspaper published from 1964 to 1978.

Later years

In the 1960s, Winchell wrote some columns for the film magazine Photoplay. He announced his retirement on February 5, 1969, citing his son's suicide as a major reason as well as the delicate health of his companion, June Magee. Exactly one year after his retirement, Magee died at a hospital in Phoenix, Arizona, while undergoing treatment for a heart condition.

Winchell spent his final two years as a recluse at the Ambassador Hotel in Los Angeles.

Winchell died of prostate cancer at the age of 74 on February 20, 1972, in Los Angeles, California. He is buried at Greenwood/Memory Lawn Mortuary & Cemetery in Phoenix.  Larry King, who replaced Winchell at the Miami Herald, recalled:

He was so sad. You know what Winchell was doing at the end? Typing out mimeographed sheets with his column, handing them out on the corner. That's how sad he got. When he died, only one person came to his funeral: his daughter.

Several of Winchell's former co-workers had expressed a willingness to go but were turned back by his daughter Walda.

Filmography

Legacy
Even during Winchell's lifetime, journalists were critical of his effect on the media. In 1940, St. Clair McKelway, who had earlier written a series of articles about him in The New Yorker, wrote in Time:

the effect of Winchellism on the standards of the press... When Winchell began gossiping in 1924 for the late scatological tabloid Evening Graphic, no U.S. paper hawked rumors about the marital relations of public figures until they turned up in divorce courts. For 16 years, gossip columns spread until even the staid New York Times whispered that it heard from friends of a son of the President that he was going to be divorced. In its first year, The Graphic would have considered this news not fit to print... Gossip-writing is at present like a spirochete in the body of journalism... Newspapers... have never been held in less esteem by their readers or exercised less influence on the political and ethical thought of the times.

Winchell responded to McKelway saying, "Oh stop! You talk like a high-school student of journalism."

Despite the controversy surrounding Winchell, his popularity allowed him to leverage support for causes that he valued. In 1946, following the death from cancer of his close friend and fellow writer Damon Runyon, Winchell appealed to his radio audience for contributions to fight the disease. The response led Winchell to establish the Damon Runyon Cancer Memorial Fund, since renamed the Damon Runyon Cancer Research Foundation. He led the charity with the support of celebrities, including Marlene Dietrich, Bob Hope, Milton Berle, Marilyn Monroe, and Joe DiMaggio, until his death from cancer in 1972.

In 1950, Ernest Lehman, a former publicity writer for Irving Hoffman of The Hollywood Reporter, wrote a story for Cosmopolitan titled "Tell Me About It Tomorrow". The piece is about a ruthless journalist, J.J. Hunsecker, and is generally thought to be a thinly veiled commentary on the power wielded by Winchell at the height of his influence. It was made into the film Sweet Smell of Success (1957), with the screenplay written by Lehman and Clifford Odets.

Walter Winchell is credited for coining the word "frienemy" in an article published by the Nevada State Journal on 19 May 1953.

In his 1961 novel Stranger in a Strange Land, Robert A. Heinlein introduced the term "winchell" into the American vocabulary as a term for a politically intrusive gossip columnist, in reference to the character Ben Caxton. He contrasted Winchell with Walter Lippmann, another well-known journalist, whose forte was politics rather than celebrity gossip.

Winchellism and Winchellese
Winchell's colorful and widely imitated language inspired the term "Winchellism," meaning "any word or phrase brought to the fore by the columnist Walter Winchell" or his imitators. An etymologist of his day said, "there are plenty of ... expressions which he has fathered and which are now current among his readers and imitators and constitute a flash language which has been called Winchellese. Through a newspaper column which has nation-wide circulation, Winchell has achieved the position of dictator of contemporary slang." His use of slang, innuendo and invented euphemisms also protected him from libel accusations.

Winchell invented his own phrases that were viewed as slightly racy at the time. Some of the expressions for falling in love used by Winchell were: "pashing it", "sizzle for", "that way", "go for each other", "garbo-ing it", "uh-huh"; and in a similar vein, "new Garbo, trouser-crease-eraser", and "pash". Some Winchellisms for marriage are: "middle-aisle it", "altar it", "handcuffed", "Mendelssohn March", "Lohengrin it", and "merged".

In a pejorative sense, "Winchellism" may also refer to scandal-mongering or sensationalistic libel.

In popular culture

 Buddy Greco in 1960 recorded an updated version of the 1937 Rodgers and Hart song "The Lady is a Tramp" to include several 1950s cultural references. Among the lady's peculiar habits and attitudes listed in the lyrics, Greco adds "Why, she even reads Walter Winchell and understands every line. That’s why the lady is a tramp."
 The song "Let's Fly Away" from the 1930 Cole Porter musical The New Yorkers includes the lines "Let's fly away, and find a land that's so provincial, we'll never hear what Walter Winchell might be forced to say."
Lee Tracy starred in the 1932 movie "Blessed Event" as a thinly-disguised version of Winchell. The movie's title refers to Winchell's way of describing a pregnancy/birth on his radio broadcast.
 Groucho Marx did a Winchell parody in the Marx Brothers movie "Horsefeathers" (1932). It included burlesques of Winchell's use of the phrase 'blessed event', his radio sign-off of "O.K., America!", and his use of a toy siren whistle on the program to punctuate items.
 Winchell starred as himself in the movie Wake Up and Live (1937) and its follow-up, Love and Hisses (1937).
 In the Warner Brothers cartoon, Porky's Movie Mystery (1939), a radio announcer at the beginning of the short identified himself as "Walter Windshield."
 Waldo Winchester, newspaper scribe, was a recurring figure in Damon Runyon's fiction.
 In the film Sweet Smell of Success (1957), Burt Lancaster plays J. J. Hunsecker, a tyrannical gossip columnist widely understood by audiences at the time to be based on Winchell.
In Robert Heinlein's 1961 novel Stranger in a Strange Land, characters refer to syndicated columnist Ben Caxton as a "winchell", the lower case indicating that in the future world of the novel, "winchell" has become a common noun.
 He was caricatured as a bird in the Warner Brothers' cartoons The Coo-Coo Nut Grove and The Woods Are Full of Cuckoos in 1936 and 1937 respectively.
 Long time San Francisco gossip columnist Herb Caen used Winchell for a model, calling the style 'three dot journalism'. Caen made a point of being well connected and on top of all the news, but unlike Winchell, Caen was ethical, did not smear, and was universally respected in his area.
Winchell is listed in the first verse (concerning the 1950s) of Billy Joel's 1989 song, "We Didn't Start the Fire", between South Pacific and Joe DiMaggio.
In 1991, Winchell was portrayed by Craig T. Nelson in the HBO biopic The Josephine Baker Story
The HBO biopic entitled Winchell (1998), cast Stanley Tucci in the title role and Paul Giamatti as Herman Klurfeld, his sidekick and ghostwriter.
 Walter Winchell has a role in Douglas Kennedy's The Pursuit of Happiness  (2001), a novel in which Winchell, in connection with McCarthy circles, destroys the reputation of the brother of the novel main character
 Walter Winchell has a major role in Philip Roth's The Plot Against America (2004, adapted as miniseries 2020), an alternate history novel which depicts Charles Lindbergh winning the 1940 presidential election. A fictionalized Winchell becomes the principal voice against President Lindbergh and the rise of fascism in America.
 In the 1991 film Oscar, Sylvester Stallone's character asks, "Why don't you phone it in to Walter Winchell?", after soon-to-be son-in-law blabs within earshot of other guests that their daughter is 'having the chauffeur's baby'".
In the 2001 musical The Producers and its 2005 film adaptation, Matthew Broderick's character briefly mentions wanting to "read (his) name in Winchell's column."
 In the second season of television series Fargo, which was released in 2015, Betsy Solverson tells her husband "Good night, Mr Solverson" and Lou replies "Good night, Mrs. Solverson – and all the ships at sea," paraphrasing how Winchell introduced his radio broadcasts.
 In October 2020, Walter Winchell: The Power Of Gossip, an episode of American Masters on PBS, profiled Winchell's life and times, touching on his career, connections, and controversy.
 During the intro portion of rock band Shellac's song "The End of Radio", from the group's 2007 album Excellent Italian Greyhound, singer Steve Albini speaks the line, "Signing off, Mr. and Mrs. America, all the ships at sea … ."

References

Further reading
 Brooks, Tim and Marsh, Earle, The Complete Directory to Prime Time Network and Cable TV Shows.

External links

 
 
 Walter Winchell papers, 1920–1967, held by the Billy Rose Theatre Division, New York Public Library for the Performing Arts
 A remembrance by a contemporary
 Dick Cavett remembers an evening with WW
 FBI file on Walter Winchell 

American broadcast news analysts
American male journalists
American people of Russian-Jewish descent
American radio personalities
Deaths from cancer in California
Deaths from prostate cancer
American gossip columnists
Writers from Minneapolis
Vaudeville performers
1897 births
1972 deaths
Jewish American journalists
20th-century American journalists
United States Navy personnel of World War I
United States Navy officers
20th-century American Jews